Andre Oktaviansyah (born 23 October 2002) is an Indonesian professional footballer who plays as a defensive midfielder for Liga 1 club Persebaya Surabaya.

Club career

Persikabo 1973
He was signed for Persikabo 1973 to play in Liga 1 in the 2021 season. Andre made his first-team debut on 3 September 2021 as a substitute in a match against Madura United at the Indomilk Arena, Tangerang.

Persebaya Surabaya
Andre was signed for Persebaya Surabaya to play in Liga 1 in the 2022–23 season. He made his league debut on 19 August 2022 in a match against Borneo Samarinda at the Segiri Stadium, Samarinda.

Career statistics

Club

Notes

Honours

International 
Indonesia U16
 JENESYS Japan-ASEAN U-16 Youth Football Tournament: 2017
 AFF U-16 Youth Championship: 2018

References

External links
 Andre Oktaviansyah at Soccerway
 Andre Oktaviansyah at Liga Indonesia

2002 births
Living people
People from Depok
Indonesian footballers
Liga 1 (Indonesia) players
Persikabo 1973 players
Persebaya Surabaya players
Indonesia youth international footballers
Association football midfielders
Sportspeople from West Java